Joe Caroff (born August 18, 1921) is an American graphic designer, best known for his design of film posters and corporate logos.

Life
Joseph Caroff was born in Linden, New Jersey, to Jewish immigrant parents from Babruysk. After graduating from high school, Caroff studied at the Pratt Institute in Brooklyn until 1942. While still a student, he worked as an assistant in the Manhattan studio of French poster designer Jean Carlu. Shortly after finishing his studies, Caroff was drafted for service in the U.S. Army and stationed in Molesworth, Great Britain.

After returning to New York from active duty, Caroff was employed at Alan Berni Associates, then worked freelance for publishing, packaging, and film production projects. In 1965, he founded the agency J. Caroff Associates, Inc. In 1986, he partnered with Lon Kirschner to form the agency Kirschner Caroff. In 2006, at the age of 85, Caroff ended his graphic design career and dedicated himself to paintings and drawings which were presented at art exhibitions. Joe Caroff and his wife Phyllis live in New York City, where they sponsor the Phyllis and Joseph Caroff Foundation for Health and Mental Health funding need based scholarships for students attending Hunter College School of Social Work.

In 2021, German designer Thilo von Debschitz managed to contact the mostly forgotten Caroff. After several interviews, Debschitz published an eight-page article in the German Grafikmagazin in August 2021 (the month of Caroff's 100th birthday) and a six-page article in the British design magazine eye in December 2021. In the articles, Debschitz looked back on Caroff's life and work. 

In October 2022, the documentary By Design: The Joe Caroff Story was released on U.S. television. On 14th November 2022, Film Forum, a well-known cinema dedicated to independent movies, held a special screening in New York City that was attended by the filmmakers and Caroff himself.

Works
At the age of 27, under the name Joseph Karov, Caroff created the book jacket for Norman Mailer’s first novel, The Naked and the Dead. The design was exhibited at the Book Jacket Designers Guild Exhibition (1948) as well as at the 28th Annual Exhibition of Advertising and Editorial Art by the Art Director’s Club of New York and at the exhibition “Modern Art in Your Life” at the Museum of Modern Art (1949).

Caroff created the poster design for the movie West Side Story (1961), often wrongly credited to Saul Bass who did design the animated title sequence for the film.

For the launch of the James Bond movie franchise in 1962, Caroff conceptualized 007 with the integral pistol which became the signature of the brand, which remains in use.

Some of the work his agency J. Caroff Associates created were posters and lettering for over 300 movies including Cabaret (director: Bob Fosse), Last Tango in Paris (director: Bernardo Bertolucci) and Zelig (director: Woody Allen).

In addition, Caroff designed animated title sequences, e.g. for The Last Temptation of Christ (director: Martin Scorsese) or Death of a Salesman (director: Volker Schlöndorff). Other work conceived by Caroff’s associates at the studio include Burt Kleeger’s lettering and posters for the Woody Allen comedies Manhattan and Stardust Memories.

Beside film posters, Joe Caroff created product and company logos, e.g. for the TV broadcasting station Fox or ABC Olympics (a sports reporting subbrand of the broadcasting service ABC). The last-mentioned project led to a lawsuit between ABC and a sculptor who had come up with a similar formal idiom.

Handdrawn lettering by Caroff inspired designers in the development of complete typefaces. In 2008, British type designer Jonathan Hill created the typeface Laser Disco based on Caroffs lettering for the movie Rollerball. In 1975, British type designer Colin Brignall created the font Tango based on Caroffs lettering for Last Tango in Paris.

References

1921 births
Living people
American graphic designers
American centenarians
Pratt Institute alumni
United States Army personnel of World War II
Men centenarians